The Midway Station Site is a former way station on the Overland Trail in Carbon County, Wyoming. Built in 1850, the station was on a heavily traveled stage and emigration route, halfway between Saratoga and Walcott, providing its name. Nothing remains of the station beyond depressions in the earth. The site was placed on the National Register of Historic Places on December 6, 1978.

References

External links
 Midway Station Site at the Wyoming State Historic Preservation Office

National Register of Historic Places in Carbon County, Wyoming
Overland Trail
Stagecoach stations on the National Register of Historic Places in Wyoming
1850 establishments in the United States